Aldemir Bendine (born 10 December 1963) was the chief executive officer (CEO) of Petrobras.

Biography 
Aldemir Bendine worked for Banco do Brasil since the age of 15, rising to CEO. He was named CEO of Brazil's state-run oil company Petrobras, leaving his position as head of Brazil's state controlled commercial bank. 

He was born in 1963, and has worked at the country's largest bank by assets, Banco do Brasil from the age of 15, eventually becoming its CEO. Bendine has been CEO of Petrobras from February 2015 to May 2016.

Aldemir Bendine has been a BRF board member since September 2015.

He was arrested in Operation Car Wash (Portuguese: Operação Lava Jato), a criminal investigation carried out by the Federal Police of Brazil on July 27, 2017.

He was charged by federal prosecutors with “passive corruption”, money laundering, criminal organization, and obstruction of justice.

References

External links

Living people
1963 births
Brazilian bankers
Brazilian businesspeople
Brazilian chief executives